The Circolo Canottieri Aniene is an Italian multi-sport club based in Rome, founded in 1892.

Main athletes

Below is the list of the main athletes who have been in force in the Circolo Canottieri Aniene.

Swimming
 Federica Pellegrini
 Margherita Panziera
 Benedetta Pilato

See also
 Tennis in Italy

References

External links
 

Multi-sport clubs in Italy